The Czechoslovakia men's national under 20 ice hockey team was the national under-20 ice hockey team in Czechoslovakia. The team represented Czechoslovakia at the International Ice Hockey Federation's IIHF World Junior Championship. After the split in Czechoslovakia, the Czech Republic took the lead in the main series and Slovakia had to start the C-League qualifiers.

References

Junior national ice hockey teams
Junior